Ypsolopha lyonothamnae is a moth of the family Ypsolophidae. It is known from the Channel Islands of California in the United States.

The larvae feed on Lyonothamnus species.

References

Ypsolophidae
Endemic fauna of California
Moths of North America
Fauna of the California chaparral and woodlands
Natural history of the Channel Islands of California
Fauna without expected TNC conservation status